Road to Rio  was a 30-minute football show of ABS-CBN. It served as the primer show for the upcoming 2014 FIFA World Cup in Brazil. It was hosted by Marielle Benitez and Alexander Borromeo, members of the Philippine National Football Team for Men and Women and Atom Araullo.  It originally aired every Saturdays on Balls Channel with episodes rebroadcast on Sundays on ABS-CBN Sports and Action. Its final episode aired on June 7, 2014, 6 days before the 2014 FIFA World Cup opening day. The network served as the licensed TV broadcasters of the FIFA World Cup in the Philippines.

Guests
 Darren Hartmann 
 Armand Del Rosario
 Paulo Buendia

Background
Road to Rio discussed viewers through a history lesson of football’s biggest stage, including the legendary players who have delighted the crowd and their greatest plays and moments.

Benitez, Borromeo and Araullo will give news and updates on the 32 teams that qualified to this year’s World Cup, their rosters, and the match-ups. They will also discuss the basic rules of football and the officials in charge of enforcing those rules on the field.

See also
Touchline

Philippine sports television series
Football in the Philippines